Scorn, in comics, may refer to:

Scorn (DC Comics), a DC Comics character
Scorn (Marvel Comics), a Marvel Comics superhero
Scorn, a Chris Crosby-created superheroine

See also
Scorn (disambiguation)